World's Funniest Animals is an American video clip television series produced by Associated Television International that premiered on The CW on September 18, 2020.

Premise
Following a format similar to America's Funniest Home Videos/The Planet's Funniest Animals, the series showcases viral internet clips of funny animal moments as well as celebrity guests, their pets, and panelists to commentate on the clips.

Episodes

Series overview

Season 1 (2020–21)

Spring special (2021)

Summer special (2021)

Season 2 (2021–22)

Halloween special (2021)

Christmas special (2021)

Valentines Day special (2022)

National Puppy Day special (2022)

Season 3 (2022–23)

Development
On May 14, 2020, The CW announced that in light of television production being suspended across the United States on account of the COVID-19 pandemic, the network would push its new season to January 2021 and would air acquired and encore programming in the fall of 2020 instead. This gave rise to World's Funniest Animals, as the series consists mainly of a compilation of comic animal clips from various sources and thus is easy to be produced largely remotely. Shortly after, it was announced that the series would be hosted by Elizabeth Stanton. On August 17, 2020, it was announced that the series would premiere on September 18, 2020. On December 7, 2020, the series was renewed for a second season, which premiered on October 9, 2021. On January 20, 2022, the series was renewed for a third season, which premiered on October 22, 2022.

References

2020 American television series debuts 
2020s American comedy television series
2020s American video clip television series
English-language television shows
The CW original programming
Television series by Associated Television International
Television series about animals